George Williams (1935 – 24 December 2016) was a British racewalking athlete. A top walker of his generation, he won the bronze medal in the 20 kilometres race walk at the inaugural 1961 IAAF World Race Walking Cup. He was one of three Britons to medal at the event, the others being Ken Matthews and Don Thompson – both went on to win Olympic titles.

He retired from the sport in his twenties, though Paul Nihill (an Olympic and European medallist) credited Williams with his successful approach to training methods in the developing sport. Williams published an autobiography, Run, Rabbit, Run, Rabbit, Run, Run, Run, in 2010 covering his sporting exploits. He died on 24 December at the age of 81.

References

1935 births
2016 deaths
British male racewalkers
English male racewalkers